Moondyne is an 1879 novel by John Boyle O'Reilly. It is loosely based on the life of the Western Australian convict escapee and bushranger Moondyne Joe. It is believed to be the first ever fictional novel set in Western Australia. In 1913, Melbourne film director W. J. Lincoln made a silent film of the same name.

Background 
O'Reilly was a Fenian revolutionary who was transported as a convict to Western Australia. During his time in Western Australia's penal system. After thirteen months in Western Australia, O'Reilly escaped the colony on board the American whaling ship Gazelle. He arrived in America in 1869 and settled in Boston, where he established himself as a respected journalist, newspaper editor, novelist and poet, and later helped orchestrate the 1876 Catalpa rescue of six Fenian convicts from Western Australia.

Around the time O'Reilly was stationed in Bunbury in 1868, he had begun to hear about the exploits of convict Joseph Bolitho Johns aka Moondyne Joe, who at that time was still on the run from authorities after escaping from Fremantle Prison in 1867. It has been rumoured that O'Reilly's subsequent escape in 1869 was partly due to inspiration from Johns' escape stories. A week after O'Reilly absconded from his convict camp in February, 1869, Johns was captured at the cellars for Houghton Winery in Perth, he was sent back to prison but was given a ticket of leave in 1871.

At the time when O'Reilly published Moondyne, Johns had just married Louisa Hearn in Fremantle and was prospecting for gold near Southern Cross. He most likely never knew for the rest of his life that he was the main inspiration for the novel.

Publication details
The novel Moondyne originally appeared as a serial in O'Reilly's newspaper The Pilot in 1878, under the title Moondyne Joe. Applauded by critics, it was published and republished under a variety of titles including:
 Moondyne Joe: A Story from the Underworld
 Moondyne: A Tale of Convict Life in Western Australia
 Moondyne: A Story of Life in West Australia
 Moondyne: An Australian Tale
 Moondyne, or, The Mystery of Mr Wyville
 The Golden Secret, or Bond and Free
 The Moondyne
 A Tale of Bush and Convict Life
 An Múindín (Irish-language translation, 1931).

Plot summary
Moondyne Joe is a convict who escapes after being victimised and mistreated by a cruel penal system. While on the run he is befriended by a tribe of Aboriginal people who share with him their secret of a huge gold mine. Joe uses his new-found wealth to return to England and become a respected humanitarian under the assumed name Wyville. Recognised as possessing expertise in penal reform, he is ultimately sent back to Western Australia to help reform the colony's penal system. In the course of this he becomes involved in several subplots including the case of a young woman named Alice Walmsley who has been wrongly convicted of murdering her own child. Wyville/Moondyne succeeds in saving Alice from false imprisonment, helps to reform Western Australia's penal system, and achieves a number of other admirable ends before dying trying to save Alice and Sheridan from bushfires.

1913 film

In 1913, the Melbourne-based Lincoln-Cass Film Company produced Moondyne, a black and white silent film based on O'Reilly's novel.

It is considered a lost film.

Plot
In 1848, convict Joe is assigned as a labourer to settled Isaac Bowman in Western Australia. Joe escapes and takes refuge with a tribe of aborigines led by Te Mana Roa, who tell him about a mountain of gold.

Bowman recaptures Joe, who tells him about the mine. Bowman goes to the mine, kills the chief and loads his horse with gold, but ends up perishing in the desert, leaving Joe with his aboriginal friends.

Cast
 George Bryant as Joe Moondyne; 
 Roy Redgrave as Isaac Bowman
 Godfrey Cass as Te Mana Roa.

Production
The film was shot in and around Melbourne.

Reception
According to one review:
The true story of Joe Gilchrist, though poetised in the drama to some extent, affords scope for much dramatic feeling and scenic display, and the many views of Australian scenery are delightful. The acting is vigorous and full of character, and the photographic work sharp and clear. Generally, it may be said that 'Moondyne' is quite up to American and European standard, and should command much attention in other parts of the world.

Legacy
In 2019, a festival was held in Fremantle to commemorate the 150th anniversary of O'Reilly's escape titled the Moondyne Walk, where a series of different readers would read out a chapter of the novel. The list of readers included former Western Australian premier Peter Dowding, epidemiologist Fiona Stanley, author and journalist Peter FitzSimons and actor Peter Rowsthorn.

See also

 Moondyne (disambiguation)

References

Further reading
 
 Since 2002, an edited and annotated edition of Moondyne has been available online through University College Cork's Corpus of Electronic Texts (CELT). See especially the Preamble.

External links
 Moondyne at AustLit

1879 novels
1913 films
1913 Western (genre) films
1913 lost films
19th-century Australian novels
Australian black-and-white films
Bushranger films
Irish novels adapted into films
Lost Australian films
Lost Western (genre) films
Novels set in Western Australia
Silent Australian Western (genre) films